Dinajpur-3 is a constituency represented in the Jatiya Sangsad (National Parliament) of Bangladesh since 2008 by Iqbalur Rahim of the Awami League.

Boundaries 
The constituency encompasses Dinajpur Sadar Upazila.

History 
The constituency was created for the first general elections in newly independent Bangladesh, held in 1973.

Members of Parliament

Elections

Elections in the 2010s

Elections in the 2000s 

Khurshid Jahan died in June 2006. To fill the vacant seat, the Election Commission planned a by-election for 7 September. The High Court, however, blocked the by-election on the grounds that it would be wasteful, as the parliament's tenure was due to end in October with the formation of a caretaker government in preparation for the next general election.

Elections in the 1990s

References

External links
 

Parliamentary constituencies in Bangladesh
Dinajpur District, Bangladesh